Seochon (서촌) is one of the oldest neighborhoods of Jongno-gu in northern Seoul, South Korea. It translates as "West village" or "Western village" as it is west of the Gyeongbok Palace. It is also thought that the name could have derived from Mt Inwangsan as the mountain used to be called "Seosan" or "old mountain in the west." Seochon is traditionally associated with the Joseon dynasty and Korean literature.

Boundaries  

Seochon is located west of the Gyeongbokgung Palace, at the base of Mt. Inwangsan. The Seoul City Wall and the Sajik and Jahamun subway tunnels are the boundaries of the neighborhood. The neighborhood is composed of fifteen smaller neighborhoods called "dong." Seochon is located at 36° 39' 25.794'' N 127° 24' 4.3848'' E with an average elevation of 33.141 m / 108.732 feet.

Culture and traditions 

Korean literature is filled with references to Seochon neighborhoods. While few original landmarks remain intact, the neighborhood contains many historical signs and is the birthplace of King Sejong. Traditionally, the area is of great significance to shamanists and geomancy, partially due to its proximity to the Inwangsan mountain. The neighborhood also contains the Seoul Sajikdan and Jongmyo shrines, along with the Gyeongbok palace. Protected historical landmarks in the neighborhood also include a cluster of over 600 hanok, the Yi Sang and Yi Sangbeom Houses, and the Pak No-soo House in Ogin-dong, which was recently restored and opened as the Pak No-soo Art Museum.

Tongin Market 

Located in Hyoja-dong, the Tongin Market dates back to 1941 when Korea was still under Japanese rule. After the Korean War, the market grew, and stalls in the market grew in demand. The market now contains over 70 stores, including several restaurants and a grocery store for tourists.

Landmarks

Sajik Park 
Sajik Park was designed in the Choseon Dynasty era and opened to the public in 1922. It was built for worshiping the Earth and harvest gods and is one of the oldest parks in Seoul.

Tongui-dong 
Tongui-dong is a neighbourhood in Seochon. During the Joseon Dynasty, High court officials walked through this place to go to work, and merchants and craftsmen set up shops there. It was also the home of several famous historical figures, including the painters Yi Jung-seop and Yi Sang-beom and the poets Yun Dongju and Yi Sang.

Daelim Contemporary Art Museum 
The Daelim Contemporary Art Museum is located in the residential area of Tongui-dong, and is near the Gyeongbokgung Palace. The Daelim Museum began as a photography museum, eventually widening its scope to include design and a wide range of other art fields.

The National Palace Museum of Korea 
The National Palace Museum of Korea has a large collection of art and objects from the palaces of the Joseon Dynasty era. The Museum attempts to raise the public's knowledge of the artistic and cultural legacy of the Joseon Dynasty through its various exhibitions and educational programs.

See also 
 Jongno District
 Gyeongbokgung Palace
 Tongui-dong

References

External links 

Neighbourhoods of Jongno-gu
Tourist attractions in Seoul